Odontohenricia is a genus of starfish in the family Echinasteridae in the order Spinulosida.

Species
The following species are recognised:- 

Odontohenricia ahearnae Clark & Jewett, 2010
Odontohenricia anarea O'Hara, 1998
Odontohenricia aurantia Clark & Jewett, 2010
Odontohenricia clarkae Rowe & Albertson, 1988
Odontohenricia endeavouri Rowe & Albertson, 1988
Odontohenricia fisheri Rowe & Albertson, 1988
Odontohenricia hayashii Rowe & Albertson, 1988
Odontohenricia violacea Clark & Jewett, 2010

References

Echinasteridae